The Finnish Air Force Museum, formerly the Aviation Museum of Central Finland, is an aviation museum located near Jyväskylä Airport in Tikkakoski, Jyväskylä, Finland. The museum exhibits the aviation history of Finland, from the early 1900s until today. The museum is owned by the Foundation of Aviation Museum of Central Finland.

The exhibition consists of aircraft, engines and aircrew equipment which has been used by the Finnish Air Force. The equipment of the Air Force Signals Museum has its own section. A large collection of scale models gives a wider perspective to the whole field of aviation.

The museum has around 25,000 visitors.

Aircraft
The following aircraft are a selection of the collection. More aircraft are being stored elsewhere, waiting for restoration.
 Avro 504K
 Bell P-39 Airacobra
 Brewster Buffalo
 Bristol Blenheim
 De Havilland D.H.60X Moth
 De Havilland D.H. 115 Vampire Trainer T.Mk.55 
 Douglas DC-3 i.e. C-47
 Focke-Wulf Fw 44 J Stieglitz
 Fokker D.XXI
 Folland Gnat Mk.1  
 Fouga CM170 Magister
 Gourdou-Lesseurre B.3
 Ilyushin Il-28R
 Martinsyde F.4 Buzzard
 Bf 109G-6Y 167271 - MT-507
 Mignet HM-14 Pou du Ciel Taivaankirppu
 MiG-15 UTI (twin-seated)
 MiG-17
 MiG-21 F,Bis (single-seated)
 MiG-21 U,UM (twin-seated) 
 Mil Mi-1
 Mil Mi-4
 Morane-Saulnier MS 50C
 Saab 91D Safir
 Saab 35 Draken (Single- and twin-seated)
 Thulin typ D replika 
 Tiira
 Valmet Vihuri II
 VL Humu
 VL Pyörremyrsky
 VL Pyry

See also

 List of aerospace museums
 List of museums in Finland

Sources

External links

 Finnish Air Force Museum – Official homepage

Aerospace museums in Finland
Buildings and structures in Jyväskylä
Military and war museums in Finland
Museums in Central Finland